Haemanthus is a Southern African genus of flowering plants in the family Amaryllidaceae, subfamily Amaryllidoideae. Members of the genus are known as blood lily and paintbrush lily. There are some 22 known species, native to South Africa, Botswana, Namibia, Lesotho and Eswatini. About 15 species occur in the winter rainfall region of Namaqualand and the Western Cape, the remainder being found in the summer rainfall region, with one species Haemanthus albiflos occurring in both regions.

Description
Most of the species have brush-like flowerheads enclosed in four or more membranous to fleshy spathe bracts which usually match the flower colour and, like sepals, protect the flowerheads from damage and desiccation. The flowers produce abundant nectar and pollen and a faint smell unattractive to humans. Fruits are mostly globose and when ripe, range through bright red, to pink, orange and white, and are usually aromatic. Three of the species, H. albiflos, H. deformis and H. pauculifolius are evergreen; these three species have bulbs that are only partly buried, the exposed section often turning bright green. The winter rainfall region's bulbs on the other hand are mostly from arid habitats and are found fairly deep below the surface, usually flowering before producing leaves. The genus produces relatively large bulbs that act as food and water storage organs, and consist of fleshy leafbases or tunics that may be arranged in two obvious ranks - termed a distichous arrangement. The morphology of the bulbs is useful in taxonomy and identification.

Haemanthus have from one to six leaves, ranging from broad, leathery and prostrate to narrow, crisped or succulent and erect, with a variety of surface textures from smooth to extremely hairy or even sticky. A few species such as H. unifoliatus and H. nortieri, usually produce only a single erect, broad leaf. H. coccineus and H. sanguineus were two of the first species in this genus to be described and because of their reddish flowers, gave rise to the generic name, being Greek for 'blood flower'. Haemanthus is found from Namibia through Namaqualand to the Western Cape and then through the Southern Cape to the Eastern Cape as far north as KwaZulu-Natal and the Transvaal.Haemanthus species are extremely variable in their habitat requirements - from coastal dunes to mountain tops, rocky ledges to seasonally-inundated gravel plains and bogs. Some species, such as H. canaliculatus, are to some extent fire-dependent in that they need occasional burning of their fynbos habitat to clear undergrowth in order to flower.

Taxonomy
The genus Haemanthus was created in 1753 by Linnaeus. The name is derived from Greek words αίμα, haima and ανθος, anthos, meaning "blood flower". In 1838 the eccentric Constantine Samuel Rafinesque, placed H. pubescens in a new genus Leucodesmis, H. coccineus in Perihema, and H. carneus in Serena. The troubled English botanist Richard Anthony Salisbury (1761–1829) in his 1866 posthumous publication 'Genera of Plants', placed H. amarylloides under Melicho and H. albiflos under Diacles.

The genus was illustrated in Nikolaus Joseph von Jacquin's description of the rarities in the glasshouses of Schönbrunn,  Plantarum Rariorum Horti Caesarei Schoenbrunnensis Descriptiones Et Icones (1797–98). The first thorough taxonomic treatment of the genus was by Baker in 1896 and published in Flora Capensis. Nothing further was done until 1976 when Friis & Nordal published a brief review recognising only 6 species and reinstating Scadoxus. Dierdré Snijman's work published in 1984, described 21 distinct species, with H. pauculifolius, occurring only on the Transvaal Drakensberg Escarpment, later being added.

Species
A list of all the species accepted by the World Checklist of Selected Plant Families  is given below. Species formerly included in Haemanthus have been transferred to a number of genera, including Scadoxus. For example, Haemanthus grandiflorus is now Scadoxus multiflorus.

Cultivation
Haemanthus species do best in large, well-drained containers or planted out in a rockery. Depending on species, they should have full sun or partial shade - winter rainfall species preferring full sun, while summer rainfall and evergreen species need partial shade. Most species are extremely tolerant of poor soil, but should not be disturbed if they are to flower. Propagation can be by offsets (adventitious bulblets), leaf cuttings and by germination of seed. Seeds when ripe are generally surrounded by a sticky pulp, producing long silken threads which presumably are useful in anchoring the seed when germinating and in the early stages of growth.

See also

 List of plants known as lily

References

Germplasm Resources Information Network
African Flowering Plants Database
The Genus Haemanthus: A Revision - Deidré Snijman (National Botanic Gardens of South Africa 1984) 
Haemanthus
Pacific Bulb Society
Pacific Bulb Society

External links

Haemanthus paintings by Nikolaus Joseph von Jacquin
Colin Paterson-Jones & Dee Snijman 
 

 
Flora of Southern Africa
Amaryllidaceae genera
Taxa named by Carl Linnaeus
Garden plants of Southern Africa